Simon Shore (born 1959 in Hitchin, Hertfordshire) is a British director, writer, and editor. 
Shore studied film at the Royal College of Art, where he made several short films, including La Boule, which won a BAFTA award and was short-listed for the Student Oscar. He is best known for  Things to Do Before You're 30 (2004) starring Dougray Scott, Emilia Fox and Billie Piper, and After Thomas (2006), about a boy with autism. Moviemail called After Thomas "gritty, warm and funny, but above all else is a realistic insight into every parent’s worst nightmare."

Selected filmography

As director
 Get Real (1998)
 Things to Do Before You're 30 (2004)
 After Thomas (2006)

References

External links
 
 

1959 births
British film directors
British television directors
British male screenwriters
British film editors
Living people
People from Hitchin
Alumni of the Royal College of Art